The 2000 NCAA Division I-AA Football Championship Game was a postseason college football game between the Georgia Southern Eagles and the Montana Grizzlies. The game was played on December 16, 2000, at Finley Stadium, home field of the University of Tennessee at Chattanooga. The culminating game of the 2000 NCAA Division I-AA football season, it was won by Georgia Southern, 27–25.

Teams
The participants of the Championship Game were the finalists of the 2000 I-AA Playoffs, which began with a 16-team bracket.

Montana Grizzlies

Montana finished their regular season with a 10–1 record (8–0 in conference); their only loss had been to Hofstra, 10–9, in the season opener. Seeded first in the playoffs, the Grizzlies defeated 16-seed Eastern Illinois, eight-seed Richmond, and 13-seed Appalachian State to reach the final. This was the third appearance for Montana in a Division I-AA championship game, having won in 1995 and having lost in 1996.

Georgia Southern Eagles

Georgia Southern finished their regular season with a 9–2 record (7–1 in conference); one of their losses had been to Georgia of Division I-A. The Eagles, seeded third, defeated 14-seed McNeese State, 11-seed Hofstra, and second-seed Delaware to reach the final. This was the eighth appearance for Georgia Southern in a Division I-AA championship game, having five prior wins (1985, 1986, 1989, 1990, 1999) and two prior losses (1988, 1998).

Game summary

Scoring summary

Game statistics

References

Further reading

External links
2000 I-AA National Championship - Georgia Southern vs Montana via YouTube

Championship Game
NCAA Division I Football Championship Games
Georgia Southern Eagles football games
Montana Grizzlies football games
College football in Tennessee
American football competitions in Chattanooga, Tennessee
NCAA Division I-AA Football Championship Game
NCAA Division I-AA Football Championship Game